This is a list of the results of the 1905 state election in Western Australia, listed by electoral district.

Results by electoral district

Albany

Balcatta

Beverley

Boulder

Brown Hill

Bunbury

Canning

Claremont

Collie

Coolgardie

Cue

Dundas

East Fremantle

East Perth

Forrest

Fremantle

Gascoyne

Geraldton

Greenough

Guildford

Hannans

Irwin

Ivanhoe

Kalgoorlie

Kanowna

Katanning

Kimberley

Menzies

Mount Leonora

Mount Magnet

Mount Margaret

Murchison

Murray

Nelson

Northam

North Fremantle

North Perth

Perth

Pilbara

Roebourne

South Fremantle

Subiaco

Sussex

Swan

Toodyay

Wellington

West Perth

Williams

Yilgarn

York

See also
 Members of the Western Australian Legislative Assembly, 1904–1905
 Members of the Western Australian Legislative Assembly, 1905–1908

References
 

Results of Western Australian elections
1905 elections in Australia